Kim Dong-young (born February 1, 1996), professionally known as Doyoung, is a South Korean singer, actor, and host. He is best known as a member of the South Korean boy group NCT and its sub-units NCT U and NCT 127. Doyoung made his debut in April 2016 as a member of rotational unit NCT U and became a member of Seoul-based fixed unit NCT 127 in January 2017.

Aside from his music career, he has established himself as an actor. Following his supporting role in the drama series Midnight Cafe Season 3 -The Curious Stalker (2021) and he starred in Dear X Who Doesn't Love Me (2022). He also participated in the musical Marie Antoinette.

On television, Doyoung appeared as on the beauty shows Lipstick Prince (2016–2017), variety shows Law of the jungle (2019) and currently as cast member of Master in the House. Doyoung also hosted music show Show Champion (2015) and Inkigayo (2017–2018).

Early life 
Kim Dong-young was born on February 1, 1996, in Guri, Gyeonggi, South Korea. He is the younger brother of actor Gong Myung.

Career

2013-2016: Pre-debut 
In late 2013, Doyoung became a trainee under SM Entertainment's Casting System after being scouted at a "Guri City Youth Art Festival'' singing competition.

For Chanyeol's music video remake of H.O.T "Hope" on Exo 90:2014, Doyoung took part in the remake version of the song by EXO's Chen alongside his co-members Johnny, and Jaehyun, which was aired on August 15, 2014.

On January 15, 2015, Doyoung was officially introduced as a member of SM Rookies, which is a pre-debut team consisted of trainees under SM Entertainment. He was also announced as an MC on MBC Music's television music show, Show Champion alongside fellow member Jaehyun. They hosted the program from January 21 to July 1, 2015.

He made a special appearance in episode 11 of the Korean remake of The Mickey Mouse Club, singing "Beauty & the Beast" as a duet with then-SM Rookies member Koeun, which aired on Disney Channel Korea on December 13, 2015.

On February 15, 2016, he was selected as a model for the Design United brand along with Taeyong and Yuta.

2016–2018: Debut with NCT and first solo activities 

On April 5, 2016, Doyoung was confirmed as a member of boy group NCT, in the first sub-unit, NCT U, alongside five other members of the SM Rookies program. They officially debuted with the digital singles "The 7th Sense" alongside Taeyong, Ten, Jaehyun and Mark on April 8 and "Without You", alongside Taeil and Jaehyun on April 9.

In July 2016, Doyoung collaborated with Shinee's Key on the song "Cool" for the soundtrack of OCN drama 38 Squad. This marked his first solo endeavor since debuting under NCT. In November, Doyoung joined the main cast of OnStyle's beauty variety show, Lipstick Prince.

In December 2016, he was announced as a new member of NCT 127, the second sub-unit of NCT, which previously debuted in July. He officially debuted with the unit in January 2017 with the release of the EP Limitless.

He also participated in the SM Station project "Sound of Your Heart (너의 목소리)" with fellow NCT member Taeil and labelmates Yesung, Sunny, Seulgi, Wendy, and Lee Dong-woo as part of SM Town. 

In February 2017, he joined Inkigayo as an MC alongside Got7's Jinyoung and Blackpink's Jisoo. In March of the same year, he made an appearance on the MBC program We Got Married alongside his brother.

In August, he released "Stay in my Life" for the School 2017 soundtrack with fellow NCT members Taeil and Taeyong. In October, he collaborated with Gugudan's Sejeong to release "Star Blossom (별빛 이 피면)" through the second season of SM Station.

In June 2018, he released the song "Hard for Me" for the drama Rich Man. "Hard for Me" was originally sung by CHEEZE and was the first song released for the drama, later re-recorded by Doyoung.

2019-present: Further solo activities 
In March 2019, Doyoung collaborated with indie duo Rocoberry on the song "Don't Say Goodbye (헤어 지지 말아요, 우리)". Doyoung appeared on the show King of Mask Singer under the name "Assistant Manager" in July 2019. He advanced to the final round based on his renditions of "Beautiful" by Crush and "Time Spent Walking Through Memories" by Nell, competing alongside the reigning champion, Nightingale.  The following month, he was added to the regular cast of Law of the Jungle in Sunda Islands. In November, Doyoung collaborated with labelmates BoA, Siwon, J-Min, Sunny, Taemin, Suho and Wendy as part of SM Town on the song "This is Your Day (for every child, UNICEF)".

In September 2020, SM Entertainment announced that NCT would be releasing their second studio album as a group, NCT 2020 Resonance Pt. 1, with the second part NCT 2020 Resonance Pt. 2 following in November. In the first part, Doyoung participated in both of the title tracks, "Make a Wish" and "From Home" by NCT U, the only member to do so. He also participated in the B-sides "Volcano" and "Lightbulb" by NCT U and "Music, Dance" by NCT 127. In the second part, Doyoung participated in the B-side track "I.O.U" along with the other vocalists within the group.

In March 2021, Doyoung appeared in his first television drama as lead, Midnight Cafe Season 3 - The Curious Stalker. 

On April 19, it was announced that Doyoung had been cast in his first musical, Marie Antoinette, as one of the three actors playing the male lead role of Count Axel von Fersen. The musical ran from July 13 to October 3 at the Charlotte Theatre. On August 5, producer Ryan S. Jhun announced through his personal Instagram that Doyoung and fellow member Haechan would participate in the first single from his first album. The song, "Maniac", was released on August 12. 

On October 1, Doyoung released the soundtrack song "Like a Star" for the drama Yumi's Cells.

Philanthropy 
On March 8, 2022, Doyoung donated  million to the Hope Bridge Disaster Relief Association to help the victims of the massive wildfire that started in Uljin, Gyeongbuk and has spread to Samcheok, Gangwon. On February 10, 2023, Doyoung donated  million to the Community Chest of Korea to help victims of the 2023 Turkey–Syria earthquake.

Filmography

Television series

Web series

Television shows

Radio shows

Hosting

Theater

Discography

Notes

Awards and nominations

Notes

References

External links 

 Doyoung at SM Town

NCT (band) members
Living people
1996 births
K-pop singers
SM Rookies members
People from Guri
South Korean male singers
South Korean male idols
South Korean male television actors
21st-century South Korean male actors
South Korean male web series actors
21st-century South Korean singers
21st-century South Korean male singers